Thomas John Rodi (born March 27, 1949) is an American prelate of the Roman Catholic Church.  He has been serving as archbishop of the Archdiocese of Mobile in Alabama since 2008, having previously served as bishop of the Diocese of Biloxi in Mississippi from 2001 to 2008.

Biography

Early life 
Thomas Rodi was born on March 27, 1949, in New Orleans, Louisiana.  He graduated from De La Salle High School in New Orleans in 1967. He then attended Georgetown University in Washington, D.C.,  obtaining his Bachelor of Arts degree in 1971. Upon his return to New Orleans, Rodi earned a Juris Doctor degree from Tulane University Law School.  He then entered Notre Dame Seminary in New Orleans, receiving his Master of Divinity degree in 1978.

Priesthood 
Rodi was ordained to the priesthood for the Archdiocese of New Orleans by Archbishop Philip  Hannan on May 20, 1978. Rodi  then served as associate pastor at St. Ann Parish in Metairie, Louisiana and at St. Christopher the Martyr Parish in Jefferson, Louisiana.

Rodi became a judge for the metropolitan tribunal in 1983, and earned his Licentiate in Canon Law from the Catholic University of America School of Canon Law in Washington, D.C. in 1986. Rodi then taught canon law at Notre Dame Seminary until 1995.  He also served as director of the Office of Religious Education from 1988 to 1989, and of the Department of Pastoral Services from 1989 to 1996. In addition to his other duties, he was named chancellor (1992) and vicar general and curial moderator (1996) of the archdiocese. Rodi was raised by the Vatican to the rank of honorary prelate in 1992.  He served in the following Louisiana parishes:

 Administrator of St. Matthew the Apostle in River Ridge
 Pastor of Our Lady of the Rosary in New Orleans
 Pastor of St. Pius X in New Orleans
 Pastor of St. Rita in New Orleans

Bishop of Biloxi

On May 15, 2001, Rodi was appointed as the second bishop of the Diocese of Biloxi by Pope John Paul II. He received episcopal consecration on July 2. 2001. from Archbishop Oscar  Lipscomb, with Archbishop Francis Schulte and Bishop Joseph Howze serving as co-consecrators. Rodi selected as his episcopal motto: Caritas Christi Urget Nos 2 Cor 5:14, meaning, "The love of Christ compels us."

Archbishop of Mobile
Pope Benedict XVI named Rodi as the second archbishop of the Archbishop of Mobile on April 2, 2008, replacing Bishop Oscar Lipscomb. He was formally installed as archbishop on June 6 2008.

Politics
Regarding the 2021 inauguration of U.S. President Joe Biden, Rodi said, "It is also the 60th anniversary of the inauguration of the first Catholic president, President Kennedy, it was 60 years today. So by coincidence, it is very meaningful we have the second time a man who professes to be Catholic be inaugurated as president."

See also

 Catholic Church hierarchy
 Catholic Church in the United States
 Historical list of the Catholic bishops of the United States
 List of Catholic bishops of the United States
 Lists of patriarchs, archbishops, and bishops

References

External links

 Roman Catholic Archdiocese of Mobile Official Site

Episcopal succession

 

1949 births
Living people
Georgetown University alumni
Notre Dame Seminary alumni
People from New Orleans
Roman Catholic archbishops of Mobile
Roman Catholic Diocese of Biloxi
Catholic University of America alumni
Tulane University alumni
Roman Catholic bishops in Mississippi
Catholics from Louisiana
Catholic University of America School of Canon Law alumni
21st-century Roman Catholic archbishops in the United States